Tetrarhynchia is an extinct genus of brachiopods found in Jurassic strata in Europe and South America. It was a stationary epifaunal suspension feeder.

References 

Prehistoric brachiopod genera
Rhynchonellida
Jurassic brachiopods
Jurassic animals of South America
Jurassic animals of Europe